Liu Jinru (born October 13, 2000, Guangdong) is a Chinese artistic gymnast. She is a 2018 World Championships team bronze medalist.

Career

Junior 
Liu began training in gymnastics at age seven. She became a national team member in 2012.

Senior 
In 2016, Liu competed at the Cottbus World Challenge Cup, finishing eighth on vault. The same year, she finished first on vault and eighth in floor exercise at the Szombathely World Challenge Cup.

In 2017, Liu was eighth in the all-around at the London World Cup. She won gold on vault and in the team competition at the Bangkok Asian Championships.

In 2018, Liu won team gold at the Jakarta Asian Games, finishing 16th in floor exercise, 22nd on vault and 45th in individual all-around. At the Melbourne World Cup, she finished fifth on vault. At the Doha World Cup, she was fifth on vault and ninth in floor exercise. At the Doha World Championships, she won team bronze - alongside Chen Yile, Liu Tingting, Luo Huan and Zhang Jin - and finished sixth on vault.

Recognition 
Liu was named an Elite Athlete of National Class in 2014, before being named an Elite Athlete of International Class in 2019 by the General Administration of Sport in China.

References

External links 
 

2000 births
Living people
Chinese female artistic gymnasts
Gymnasts from Henan
Gymnasts at the 2018 Asian Games
Medalists at the 2018 Asian Games
Asian Games gold medalists for China
Asian Games medalists in gymnastics
People from Zhengzhou
21st-century Chinese women